Something to Think About is a 1920 American silent drama film directed by Cecil B. DeMille. The film stars Elliott Dexter and Gloria Swanson. Prints of the film exist at the George Eastman Museum in Rochester, New York, and at the Filmmuseum in Amsterdam.

Plot
As described in a film magazine, David Markely's (Dexter) affection for Ruth Anderson (Swanson) followed her from childhood and deepened with her womanhood. He is a young man of means but a cripple, while she is the daughter of a blacksmith. David persuades her father to allow him to have her educated. When she returns from school, the father realizes David's attitude towards Ruth and plans their marriage. Ruth, against her father's wishes, marries Jim Dirk (Blue), the young lover of her heart. A few years later Jim is killed in a subway accident. Ruth returns to her father for forgiveness but finds him blinded by the sparks from his forge and on the way to the county poorhouse. He is stubborn in his unforgiveness of her. She is about to take her own life when David rescues her, offering the protection of his name for her and the child that is about to be born to her. As his wife she eventually realizes a great love for him which he refuses to admit is anything but gratitude. The preachings of his housekeeper (McDowell) have an effect that brings about the reconciliation of Ruth and her father, and through the little boy Bobby (Moore) he becomes a member of the happy household.

Cast
 Elliott Dexter as David Markely
 Gloria Swanson as Ruth Anderson
 Monte Blue as Jim Dirk
 Theodore Roberts as Luke Anderson
 Claire McDowell as Housekeeper
 Michael D. Moore as Bobby (credited as Mickey Moore)
 Julia Faye as Banker's Daughter
 Jim Mason as Country Masher
 Togo Yamamoto as Servant
 Theodore Kosloff as Clown
 William Boyd (uncredited)

Production notes
Something to Think About began filming on January 20, 1920, with a budget of $169,330. Filming completed on March 30, 1920. The film was released on October 20, 1920 and grossed a total of $915,848.51.

References

External links

1920 films
1920 drama films
Silent American drama films
American silent feature films
American black-and-white films
Famous Players-Lasky films
Films directed by Cecil B. DeMille
1920s American films